Pozharsky (masculine), Pozharskaya (feminine), or Pozharskoye (neuter) is the name of several rural localities in Russia:
Pozharsky (rural locality), a railway crossing in Khasansky District of Primorsky Krai
Pozharskoye, Kirov Oblast, a village in Verkhovinsky Rural Okrug of Yuryansky District of Kirov Oblast
Pozharskoye, Primorsky Krai, a selo in Pozharsky District of Primorsky Krai
Pozharskoye, Yaroslavl Oblast, a selo in Glebovsky Rural Okrug of Pereslavsky District of Yaroslavl Oblast